Broken Vows is a 2016 American psychological thriller film directed by Bram Coppens from a screenplay written by Jim Agnew and Sean Keller, starring Wes Bentley, Jaimie Alexander, Cam Gigandet, Alexandra Breckenridge, and Astrid Bryan.

Summary
Patrick (Wes Bentley) is a charming yet troubled man. He meets Tara (Jaimie Alexander) at her bachelorette party. They have a one night stand, and when she comes back home, he goes into a psychotic rage, imagining that he is in love with her; he even goes as far as tattooing her name, Tara, on his arm.

Patrick has her smartphone, so he starts cancelling the wedding plans, the venue, the florist, etc. Tara is able to reverse all the cancellations. Her friend (Alexandra Breckenridge) gets a private investigator (Matt Gerald) who finds out that he has had some similar episodes in the past. He had fallen in love with his baby sitter when he was younger and wanted to set fire to the house.

But he is obsessed, he has hallucinations of Tara loving him. At one point, he finds Tara's sister and befriends her and his way to the wedding party.

Tara's friend arranges for the investigator to attack Patrick at the wedding party, but Patrick manages to recover. That same night, Patrick follows Tara's friend home and kills her, using her computer to crash the honeymoon. He kills a staff member by luring him outside after cutting the electricity. He attacks Tara's newlywed husband, confronts Tara at the beach and holds her at knife point. She fights him off and sets him on fire, but he recovers again. She finds Michael, but Patrick is relentless and goes on looking for Tara.

Patrick attacks Michael, but Tara finally is able to choke Patrick to death.

In the final scene, Tara and her husband recover at a hospital, but the doctor lets her know that she is pregnant, when the shock is revealed that she is carrying Patrick's baby.

Cast
 Wes Bentley as Patrick
 Jaimie Alexander as Tara
 Cam Gigandet as Michael, Tara's fiance
 Alexandra Breckenridge as Debra, one of Tara's best friends
 Astrid Bryan as Justine
 Matt Riedy as Mr. Bloom
 Alex Ladove as Emily, Tara's younger sister
 Emily Robinson as Annie, Tara's youngest sister

Production
In June 2014, Wes Bentley and Jaimie Alexander joined the cast of the film, with Bram Coppens directing the film in his directorial debut, from a screenplay by Jim Agnew and Sean Keller. Wendy Benge and Larry Ladove served as producer and executive producer, respectively, while Stonecreek Films served as the financier. In July 2014, Cam Gigandet, Alex Ladove, Alexandra Breckenridge, and Astrid Bryan joined the cast of the film.

Release
In February 2016, Grindstone Entertainment Group and Lionsgate acquired U.S. distribution rights to the film. The film was released through direct-to-DVD and video on demand on October 11, 2016.

References

External links
 
 

2016 films
American psychological drama films
American psychological thriller films
2016 psychological thriller films
American independent films
Lionsgate films
Films scored by David Julyan
2016 directorial debut films
2016 independent films
2010s English-language films
2010s American films